Hermann William Kuchmeister (October 16, 1877 – February 1, 1923) was a private serving in the United States Marine Corps during the Spanish–American War who received the Medal of Honor for bravery.

Biography
Kuchnmeister was born on October 16, 1877, in Hamburg, Germany. He joined the Marine Corps from Brooklyn in August 1897.

He was awarded the Medal of Honor for heroism during the cable cutting operation off Cienfuegos, Cuba while assigned to the cruiser USS Marblehead during the Spanish–American War.  He was honorably discharged in March 1900.

He was a member of the Naval Order of the United States.

After being discharged from the Marine Corps, Kuchmeister worked as an assistant weigher for the U.S. Customs Service in Boston.   On December 18, 1908, President Theodore Roosevelt issued Executive Order no. 992 which allowed Kuchmeister to be promoted to day inspector without further examination.

Kuchmeister died on February 1, 1923, and was buried at Winthrop Cemetery in Winthrop, Massachusetts.

Medal of Honor citation
Rank and organization: Private, U.S. Marine Corps. Born: Hamburg, Germany. Accredited to: New York. G.O. No.: 521, 7 July 1899.

Citation:

On board the U.S.S. Marblehead during the operation of cutting the cable leading from Cienfuegos, Cuba, 11 May 1898.  Facing the heavy fire of the enemy, Kuchmeister displayed extraordinary bravery and coolness throughout this action.

Awards
Medal of Honor
Sampson Medal
Spanish Campaign Medal

See also

List of Medal of Honor recipients for the Spanish–American War

References

External links

1877 births
1923 deaths
United States Marine Corps Medal of Honor recipients
United States Marines
American military personnel of the Spanish–American War
German-born Medal of Honor recipients
German emigrants to the United States
Military personnel from Hamburg
Spanish–American War recipients of the Medal of Honor